Sweetness is a basic taste most commonly perceived when eating foods rich in sugars. Sweet tastes are generally regarded as pleasurable. In addition to sugars like sucrose, many other chemical compounds are sweet, including aldehydes, ketones, and sugar alcohols. Some are sweet at very low concentrations, allowing their use as non-caloric sugar substitutes. Such non-sugar sweeteners include saccharin and aspartame. Other compounds, such as miraculin, may alter perception of sweetness itself.

The perceived intensity of sugars and high-potency sweeteners, such as Aspartame and Neohesperidin Dihydrochalcone, are heritable, with gene effect accounting for approximately 30% of the variation.

The chemosensory basis for detecting sweetness, which varies between both individuals and species, has only begun to be understood since the late 20th century. One theoretical model of sweetness is the multipoint attachment theory, which involves multiple binding sites between a sweetness receptor and a sweet substance.

Studies indicate that responsiveness to sugars and sweetness has very ancient evolutionary beginnings, being manifest as chemotaxis even in motile bacteria such as E. coli. Newborn human infants also demonstrate preferences for high sugar concentrations and prefer solutions that are sweeter than lactose, the sugar found in breast milk. Sweetness appears to have the highest taste recognition threshold, being detectable at around 1 part in 200 of sucrose in solution. By comparison, bitterness appears to have the lowest detection threshold, at about 1 part in 2 million for quinine in solution. In the natural settings that human primate ancestors evolved in, sweetness intensity should indicate energy density, while bitterness tends to indicate toxicity. The high sweetness detection threshold and low bitterness detection threshold would have predisposed our primate ancestors to seek out sweet-tasting (and energy-dense) foods and avoid bitter-tasting foods. Even amongst leaf-eating primates, there is a tendency to prefer immature leaves, which tend to be higher in protein and lower in fibre and poisons than mature leaves. The 'sweet tooth' thus has an ancient heritage, and while food processing has changed consumption patterns, human physiology remains largely unchanged.

Examples of sweet substances

A great diversity of chemical compounds, such as aldehydes and ketones, are sweet. Among common biological substances, all of the simple carbohydrates are sweet to at least some degree. Sucrose (table sugar) is the prototypical example of a sweet substance. Sucrose in solution has a sweetness perception rating of 1, and other substances are rated relative to this. For example, another sugar, fructose, is somewhat sweeter, being rated at 1.7 times the sweetness of sucrose. Some of the amino acids are mildly sweet: alanine, glycine, and serine are the sweetest. Some other amino acids are perceived as both sweet and bitter.

The sweetness of 20% solution of glycine in water compares to a solution of 10% glucose or 5% fructose.

A number of plant species produce glycosides that are sweet at concentrations much lower than common sugars. The most well-known example is glycyrrhizin, the sweet component of licorice root, which is about 30 times sweeter than sucrose. Another commercially important example is stevioside, from the South American shrub Stevia rebaudiana. It is roughly 250 times sweeter than sucrose. Another class of potent natural sweeteners are the sweet proteins such as thaumatin, found in the West African katemfe fruit. Hen egg lysozyme, an antibiotic protein found in chicken eggs, is also sweet.

Some variation in values is not uncommon between various studies. Such variations may arise from a range of methodological variables, from sampling to analysis and interpretation. Indeed, the taste index of 1, assigned to reference substances such as sucrose (for sweetness), hydrochloric acid (for sourness), quinine (for bitterness), and sodium chloride (for saltiness), is itself arbitrary for practical purposes. Some values, such as those for maltose and glucose, vary little. Others, such as aspartame and sodium saccharin, have much larger variation.

Even some inorganic compounds are sweet, including beryllium chloride and lead(II) acetate. The latter may have contributed to lead poisoning among the ancient Roman aristocracy: the Roman delicacy sapa was prepared by boiling soured wine (containing acetic acid) in lead pots.

Hundreds of synthetic organic compounds are known to be sweet, but only a few of these are legally permitted as food additives. For example, chloroform, nitrobenzene, and ethylene glycol are sweet, but also toxic. Saccharin, cyclamate, aspartame, acesulfame potassium, sucralose, alitame, and neotame are commonly used.

Sweetness modifiers

A few substances alter the way sweet taste is perceived. One class of these inhibits the perception of sweet tastes, whether from sugars or from highly potent sweeteners. Commercially, the most important of these is lactisole, a compound produced by Domino Sugar. It is used in some jellies and other fruit preserves to bring out their fruit flavors by suppressing their otherwise strong sweetness.

Two natural products have been documented to have similar sweetness-inhibiting properties: gymnemic acid, extracted from the leaves of the Indian vine Gymnema sylvestre and ziziphin, from the leaves of the Chinese jujube (Ziziphus jujuba). Gymnemic acid has been widely promoted within herbal medicine as a treatment for sugar cravings and diabetes mellitus.

On the other hand, two plant proteins, miraculin and curculin, cause sour foods to taste sweet. Once the tongue has been exposed to either of these proteins, sourness is perceived as sweetness for up to an hour afterwards. While curculin has some innate sweet taste of its own, miraculin is by itself quite tasteless.

The sweetness receptor

Despite the wide variety of chemical substances known to be sweet, and knowledge that the ability to perceive sweet taste must reside in taste buds on the tongue, the biomolecular mechanism of sweet taste was sufficiently elusive that as recently as the 1990s, there was some doubt whether any single "sweetness receptor" actually exists.

The breakthrough for the present understanding of sweetness occurred in 2001, when experiments with laboratory mice showed that mice possessing different versions of the gene T1R3 prefer sweet foods to different extents. Subsequent research has shown that the T1R3 protein forms a complex with a related protein, called T1R2, to form a G-protein coupled receptor that is the sweetness receptor in mammals.

Human studies have shown that sweet taste receptors are not only found in the tongue, but also in the lining of the gastrointestinal tract as well as the nasal epithelium, pancreatic islet cells, sperm and testes. It is proposed that the presence of sweet taste receptors in the GI tract controls the feeling of hunger and satiety.

Another research has shown that the threshold of sweet taste perception is in direct correlation with the time of day. This is believed to be the consequence of oscillating leptin levels in blood that may impact the overall sweetness of food. Scientists hypothesize that this is an evolutionary relict of diurnal animals like humans.

Sweetness perception may differ between species significantly. For example, even amongst the primates sweetness is quite variable. New World monkeys do not find aspartame sweet, while Old World monkeys and apes (including most humans) all do. Felids like domestic cats cannot perceive sweetness at all.
The ability to taste sweetness often atrophies genetically in species of carnivores who do not eat sweet foods like fruits, including bottlenose dolphins, sea lions, spotted hyenas and fossas.

Sweet receptor pathway
To depolarize the cell, and ultimately generate a response, the body uses different cells in the taste bud that each express a receptor for the perception of sweet, sour, salty, bitter or umami. Downstream of the taste receptor, the taste cells for sweet, bitter and umami share the same intracellular signalling pathway. Incoming sweet molecules bind to their receptors, which causes a conformational change in the molecule. This change activates the G-protein, gustducin, which in turn activates phospholipase C to generate inositol trisphosphate (IP3), this subsequently opens the IP3-receptor and induces calcium release from the endoplasmic reticulum. This increase in intracellular calcium activates the TRPM5 channel and induces cellular depolarization. The ATP release channel CALHM1 gets activated by the depolarization and releases ATP neurotransmitter which activates the afferent neurons innervating the taste bud.

Cognition
The color of food can affect sweetness perception. Adding more red color to a drink increases its perceived sweetness. In a study darker colored solutions were rated 2–10% higher than lighter ones despite having 1% less sucrose concentration. The effect of color is believed to be due to cognitive expectations. Some odors smell sweet and memory confuses whether sweetness was tasted or smelled.

Historical theories

The development of organic chemistry in the 19th century introduced many new chemical compounds and the means to determine their molecular structures. Early organic chemists tasted many of their products, either intentionally (as a means of characterization) or accidentally (due to poor laboratory hygiene). One of the first attempts to draw systematic correlations between molecules' structures and their tastes was made by a German chemist, Georg Cohn, in 1914. He hypothesized that to evoke a certain taste, a molecule must contain some structural motif (called a sapophore) that produces that taste. With regard to sweetness, he noted that molecules containing multiple hydroxyl groups and those containing chlorine atoms are often sweet, and that among a series of structurally similar compounds, those with smaller molecular weights were often sweeter than the larger compounds.

In 1919, Oertly and Myers proposed a more elaborate theory based on a then-current theory of color in synthetic dyes. They hypothesized that to be sweet, a compound must contain one each of two classes of structural motif, a glucophore and an auxogluc. Based on those compounds known to be sweet at the time, they proposed a list of six candidate glucophores and nine auxoglucs.

From these beginnings in the early 20th century, the theory of sweetness enjoyed little further academic attention until 1963, when Robert Shallenberger and Terry Acree proposed the AH-B theory of sweetness. Simply put, they proposed that to be sweet, a compound must contain a hydrogen bond donor (AH) and a Lewis base (B) separated by about 0.3 nanometres. According to this theory, the AH-B unit of a sweetener binds with a corresponding AH-B unit on the biological sweetness receptor to produce the sensation of sweetness.

B-X theory proposed by Lemont Kier in 1972. While previous researchers had noted that among some groups of compounds, there seemed to be a correlation between hydrophobicity and sweetness, this theory formalized these observations by proposing that to be sweet, a compound must have a third binding site (labeled X) that could interact with a hydrophobic site on the sweetness receptor via London dispersion forces. Later researchers have statistically analyzed the distances between the presumed AH, B, and X sites in several families of sweet substances to estimate the distances between these interaction sites on the sweetness receptor.

MPA theory
The most elaborate theory of sweetness to date is the multipoint attachment theory (MPA) proposed by Jean-Marie Tinti and Claude Nofre in 1991. This theory involves a total of eight interaction sites between a sweetener and the sweetness receptor, although not all sweeteners interact with all eight sites. This model has successfully directed efforts aimed at finding highly potent sweeteners, including the most potent family of sweeteners known to date, the guanidine sweeteners. The most potent of these, lugduname, is about 225,000 times sweeter than sucrose.

References

Cited

General

Further reading

 
 

Gustation
Culinary terminology